Reginald Evans may refer to:
Reggie Evans (American football) (born 1959), American football player
Reggie Evans (born 1980), American basketball player
Reg Evans (1928–2009), British-born Australian actor
Reginald Evans (born 1939), English football (soccer) player